Scuola Dante Alighieri may refer to:

 Escuela Dante Alighieri in Córdoba, Argentina
 Scuola Italiana Dante Alighieri, in Paraguay